Shamiekh Holding Group, formerly Al Bayan Holding Group is a Saudi-based business conglomerate headquartered in Riyadh, Saudi Arabia. Its subsidiaries provide real estate development and management, information and telecommunications, printing and packaging, logistics, and supply and trading.

History
In 2005, the group signed a commercial advertising deal with Minister Iyad bin Amin Madani of the Saudi Ministry of Culture and Information.

In 2012, the administration of King Abdullah Al Saud authorized the group to organize the annual Al Jenadriyah festival in Riyadh.

In 2013, the then-Governor of Riyadh, Prince Khalid bin Bandar bin Abdulaziz Al Saud, awarded Al Hammad to the  DNGO Contracting Company, one of the entities of the group, for a project of strengthening of water resources in Riyadh.

References

Conglomerate companies of Saudi Arabia
Companies based in Riyadh
Saudi Arabian companies established in 1980
Holding companies established in 1980